The United States Student Press Association (USSPA) was a national organization of campus newspapers and editors active in the 1960s. It held a national convention of college student newspaper staff each summer at a member college campus, and a national student editors conference in Washington, D.C., each year during the academic year. USSPA was developed as a program of the National Student Association (NSA).

The USSPA formed a national news agency called Collegiate Press Service (CPS). CPS was spun off and became a progressive alternative news collective in Denver, Colorado. It, too, later folded, selling its name to a commercial enterprise, and distributing the funds to progressive groups in Denver.

In 1967 Marshall Bloom was designated as heir apparent to assume the Executive Director position and lead the organization, but his push to send student editors to Cuba and defy the U.S. travel ban led the incumbent executive director and other national staff to withdraw their endorsement and support. Bloom sought to win the position at the annual meeting of the USSPA in August 1967 but lost a close vote of all student editor representatives to another candidate. 

Soon after losing that vote, Bloom founded with Ray Mungo the Liberation News Service.

USSPA later became independent, then suffered financial setbacks in the early 1970s, and disbanded.

Notable members 
 Roger Ebert served as the second president of the USSPA in 1963–64
 Harry Nussdorf, of Queens College, City University of New York, served as chair of the USSPA National Executive Board 1969–1970

References

Notes

Sources 
 Librarians Disambiguation Pages for USSPA, WorldCat

Student organizations in the United States